Connecticut elected its members September 21, 1812.

Its apportionment was unchanged after the 1810 census.

See also 
 United States House of Representatives elections, 1812 and 1813
 List of United States representatives from Connecticut

Notes 

1812
Connecticut
United States House of Representatives